Tvarditsa Municipality is a municipality in the Sliven Province of Bulgaria.

Demography

At the 2011 census, the population of Tvarditsa was 13,804. Most of the inhabitants were Bulgarians (67.79%) with a minority of Turks (9.32%) and Gypsies/Romani (15.21%). 7.07% of the population's ethnicity was unknown.

Villages
In addition to the capital town of Tvarditsa, there are 9 villages in the municipality:
 Bliznets
 Borov Dol
 Byala Palanka
 Zhult Briag
 Orizari
 Sborishte
 Surtsevo
 Chervenakovo
 Shivachevo

References

Municipalities in Sliven Province